The Morris J2 was a small, forward-control van (driver's cab on top of the engine) launched by Morris-Commercial in 1956 and produced until 1967.

Until 1961, the van was sold alongside the relatively old-fashioned and slightly smaller Morris JB-type. From 1960 the company also offered the slightly smaller Morris J4 which broadly followed the same overall architecture as the J2.

The J2 van was marketed as both the Morris J2 and the Austin J2 or Austin 152.

References

J2
Vans
Pickup trucks
Vehicles introduced in 1956
Rear-wheel-drive vehicles